Sant Dnyaneshwar is a 1940 film about the life of Jñāneśvar (1275–1296), a 13th-century Marathi poet, philosopher, sant and yogi of the Nath tradition.

Plot
Jñāneśvar was the second of the four children of Vitthal Govind Kulkarni and Rukmini, a pious couple from Apegaon near Paithan on the banks of the river Godavari. Vitthal had studied Vedas and set out on pilgrimages at a young age. In Alandi, about 30 km from Pune, Sidhopant, a local Yajurveda Brahmin was very much impressed with him and Vitthal married his daughter Rukmini.

After some time, getting permission from Rukmini, Vitthal went to Varanasi in Uttar Pradesh, India, where he met Ramananda Swami and requested to be initiated into sannyas, lying about his marriage. But Ramananda Swami later went to Alandi and, convinced that his student Vitthal was the husband of Rukmini, he returned to Kashi and ordered Vitthal to return home to his family. The couple was excommunicated from the Brahmin caste as Vitthal had broken with sannyas, the last of the four ashrams. Four children were born to them; Nivrutti, Jñāndev, Sopan, Mukta. It is believed that later Vitthal and Rukmini ended their lives by jumping into the waters at Prayag where the river Ganges meets Yamuna, hoping that their children would be accepted into the society after their death.

The orphaned children grew up on alms. They approached the Brahmin community of Paithan to accept them, but the Brahmins refused. According to the disputed "Shuddhi Patra", the children were purified by the Brahmins on the condition of observing celibacy. But when they returned, the Brahmins did not pay any attention to the Shuddhi Patra and said that it was fake. Later, a farmer took them to live with his family, where Jñāneśvar translated the Bhagavad Gita into the Marathi language and performed many miracles; riding on a flying wall was the most famous of these.

Directors
Vishnupant Govind Damle
Sheikh Fattelal

Writers
Anand Kumar
Shivram Vashikar

Cast
Shahu Modak as Dnyaneshwar
Datta Dharmadhikari 		
Pandit 		
Tamhankar 		
Shanta Majumdar 		
Sumati Gupte 		
Bhagwat

References

External links
 Full movie on YouTube
 Full movie on Dailymotion

1940 films
Indian biographical drama films
Films set in Maharashtra
Prabhat Film Company films
Articles containing video clips
1940s biographical films
Indian black-and-white films
Indian multilingual films
Religious drama films